The 2019 Trofeo Alfredo Binda-Comune di Cittiglio was the 44th running of the Trofeo Alfredo Binda, a women's cycling race in Italy. It was the third event of the 2019 UCI Women's World Tour season and was held on 24 March 2019. The race started in Gavirate and finished in Cittiglio, on the outskirts of Lago Maggiore in Northwest Italy.  

Marianne Vos won the race for the fourth time and is now tied with Maria Canins for most wins.

Teams
24 teams competed in the race.

Result

See also
2019 in women's road cycling

References

External links

2019 in Italian sport
2019
2019 UCI Women's World Tour
Trofeo Alfredo Binda-Comune di Cittiglio